MingJian (Ming Qi Jian (Shanghai) Detection Technology Services Ltd.) is a product-testing organization based in Shanghai, China. MingJian is the first Chinese member of International Consumer Research and Testing (ICRT), an international aggregate of consumer safety and product-testing organizations.

History 
University of Pennsylvania alumni James and Jessie Feldkamp started MingJian on March 15, 2010 Consumers International (World's Consumer Rights Day). They were driven to protect Chinese consumers after having their first son, Albert, following the 2008 baby formula scandal in China. Modeled after Consumer Reports in the United States, MingJian aims to provide expert advice on products and services to Chinese consumers.

Testing 
MingJian utilizes partner laboratories located throughout the US and Europe to test products against international safety and quality standards. MingJian also uses mystery shopping to anonymously obtain samples for testing.

Services 
MingJian subscribers have access to full test results, catered monthly newsletters, and public forums with other members. In addition, MingJian provides a monthly Top 5 ranking of the best five performers in a wide range of product categories spanning electronics, cosmetics, and home goods.

Campaigns

Child Restraints Save Kids Lives Campaign (2015) 
On June 1, 2015 (Children's Day), MingJian launched the first half of its child safety campaign with Child Safety On-the-Go, which based its message on testing of over 30 carseats from popular names in China and comparison models. On-the-Go was part of MingJian's long-term campaign for child safety in Chinese households, to be followed by six months of Child Safety in the Home initiatives.

The campaign announcement coincided with #SaveKidsLives, the 2015 theme of the United Nations' Decade of Action for Road Safety 2011-2020.

References

External links
 MingJian.cn  
 ICRT Official Website
 Save Kids' Lives IndieGogo 

Technology companies of China
Consumer organizations in China
Product-testing organizations
Companies based in Shanghai